Vrabac is a surname. It may refer to:

 Adin Vrabac (born 1994), Bosnia and Herzegovina basketball player
 Damir Vrabac (born 1962), Bosnia and Herzegovina footballer
 Dinko Vrabac (born 1963), Bosnia and Herzegovina footballer

See also
 
 Vrabec

South Slavic-language surnames
Surnames from nicknames